Alexander Peya (born 27 June 1980) is an Austrian male tennis player. He reached a career-high singles ranking of world no. 92 in April 2007. His career-high doubles ranking is World No. 3, first achieved in August 2013.

In September 2008 Peya helped Austria to a Davis Cup play-off win against Great Britain. Peya beat Alex Bogdanovic in four sets in the deciding rubber of the tie.

Significant finals

Grand Slam finals

Doubles: 1 (1 runner-up)

Mixed Doubles: 2 (1 title, 1 runner-up)

Masters 1000 finals

Doubles: 6 (3 titles, 3 runners-up)

ATP career finals

Doubles: 46 (17 titles, 29 runner-ups)

Performance timelines

Singles

Doubles

Current through the 2019 Miami Open.

External links 

 
 
 
 
 
 

1980 births
Living people
Austrian male tennis players
Tennis players from Vienna
Tennis players at the 2012 Summer Olympics
Tennis players at the 2016 Summer Olympics
Olympic tennis players of Austria
Wimbledon champions
Grand Slam (tennis) champions in mixed doubles